The Leaning Tower of Pisa, or simply, the Tower of Pisa (torre di Pisa ), is the campanile, or freestanding bell tower, of Pisa Cathedral. It is known for its nearly four-degree lean, the result of an unstable foundation. The tower is one of three structures in the Pisa's Cathedral Square (Piazza del Duomo), which includes the cathedral and Pisa Baptistry.

The tower has 296 or 294 steps; the seventh floor has two fewer steps on the north-facing staircase.

The tower began to lean during construction in the 12th century, due to soft ground which could not properly support the structure's weight. It worsened through the completion of construction in the 14th century. By 1990, the tilt had reached 5.5 degrees. The structure was stabilized by remedial work between 1993 and 2001, which reduced the tilt to 3.97 degrees.

Architect 
There has been controversy surrounding the identity of the architect of the Leaning Tower of Pisa. For many years, the design was attributed to Guglielmo and Bonanno Pisano, a well-known 12th-century resident artist of Pisa, known for his bronze casting, particularly in the Pisa Duomo. Pisano left Pisa in 1185 for Monreale, Sicily, only to come back and die in his home town. A piece of cast bearing his name was discovered at the foot of the tower in 1820, but this may be related to the bronze door in the façade of the cathedral that was destroyed in 1595. A 2001 study seems to indicate Diotisalvi was the original architect, due to the time of construction and affinity with other Diotisalvi works, notably the bell tower of San Nicola and the Baptistery, both in Pisa.

Construction 
Construction of the tower occurred in three stages over 199 years. The sum was then used toward the purchase of a few stones which still form the base of the bell tower. On 9 August 1173, the foundations of the tower were laid. Work on the ground floor of the white marble campanile began on 14 August of the same year during a period of military success and prosperity. This ground floor is a blind arcade articulated by engaged columns with classical Corinthian capitals. Nearly four centuries later Giorgio Vasari wrote: "Guglielmo, according to what is being said, in the year 1174, together with sculptor Bonanno, laid the foundations of the bell tower of the cathedral in Pisa".

The tower began to sink after construction had progressed to the second floor in 1178. This was due to a mere three-metre foundation, set in weak, unstable subsoil, a design that was flawed from the beginning. Construction was subsequently halted for almost a century, as the Republic of Pisa was almost continually engaged in battles with Genoa, Lucca, and Florence. This allowed time for the underlying soil to settle. Otherwise, the tower would almost certainly have toppled. On 27 December 1233, the worker Benenato, son of Gerardo Bottici, oversaw the continuation of the tower's construction.

On 23 February 1260, Guido Speziale, son of Giovanni Pisano, was elected to oversee the building of the tower. On 12 April 1264, the master builder Giovanni di Simone, architect of the Camposanto, and 23 workers went to the mountains close to Pisa to cut marble. The cut stones were given to Rainaldo Speziale, worker of St. Francesco. In 1272, construction resumed under Di Simone. In an effort to compensate for the tilt, the engineers built upper floors with one side taller than the other. Because of this, the tower is curved. Construction was halted again in 1284 when the Pisans were defeated by the Genoese in the Battle of Meloria.

The seventh floor was completed in 1319. The bell-chamber was finally added in 1372. It was built by Tommaso di Andrea Pisano, who succeeded in harmonizing the Gothic elements of the belfry with the Romanesque style of the tower. There are seven bells, one for each note of the musical major scale. The largest one was installed in 1655.

History following construction 
Between 1589 and 1592, Galileo Galilei, who lived in Pisa at the time, is said to have dropped two cannonballs of different masses from the tower to demonstrate that their speed of descent was independent of their mass, in keeping with the law of free fall. The primary source for this is the biography Racconto istorico della vita di Galileo Galilei (Historical Account of the Life of Galileo Galilei), written by Galileo's pupil and secretary Vincenzo Viviani in 1654, but only published in 1717, long after his death.

During World War II, the Allies suspected that the Germans were using the tower as an observation post. Leon Weckstein, a U.S. Army sergeant sent to confirm the presence of German troops in the tower, was impressed by the beauty of the cathedral and its campanile, and thus refrained from ordering an artillery strike, sparing it from destruction.

Numerous efforts have been made to restore the tower to a vertical orientation or at least keep it from falling over. Most of these efforts failed; some worsened the tilt. On 27 February 1964, the government of Italy requested aid in preventing the tower from toppling. It was, however, considered important to retain the current tilt, due to the role that this element played in promoting the tourism industry of Pisa.

Starting in 1993, 870 tonnes of lead counterweights were added, which straightened the tower slightly.

The tower and the neighbouring cathedral, baptistery, and cemetery are included in the Piazza del Duomo UNESCO World Heritage Site, which was declared in 1987.

The tower was closed to the public on 7 January 1990, after more than two decades of stabilisation studies and spurred by the abrupt collapse of the Civic Tower of Pavia in 1989. The bells were removed to relieve some weight, and cables were cinched around the third level and anchored several hundred meters away. Apartments and houses in the path of a potential fall of the tower were vacated for safety. The selected method for preventing the collapse of the tower was to slightly reduce its tilt to a safer angle by removing  of soil from underneath the raised end. After a decade of corrective reconstruction and stabilization efforts, the tower was reopened to the public on 15 December 2001, and was declared stable for at least another 300 years. In total,  of soil were removed.

After a phase (1990–2001) of structural strengthening, the tower has been undergoing gradual surface restoration to repair visible damage, mostly corrosion and blackening. These are particularly pronounced due to the tower's age and its exposure to wind and rain.
In May 2008, engineers announced that the tower had been stabilized such that it had stopped moving for the first time in its history. They stated that it would be stable for at least 200 years.

Earthquake survival 
At least four strong earthquakes have hit the region since 1280, but the apparently vulnerable tower survived. The reason was not understood until a research group of 16 engineers investigated. The researchers concluded that the tower was able to withstand the tremors because of dynamic soil-structure interaction (DSSI): the height and stiffness of the tower, together with the softness of the foundation soil, influences the vibrational characteristics of the structure in such a way that the tower does not resonate with earthquake ground motion. The same soft soil that caused the leaning and brought the tower to the verge of collapse helped it survive.

Technical information 

 Elevation of Piazza del Duomo: about 2 metres (6 feet, DMS)
 Height from the ground floor: , 8 stories
 Height from the foundation floor: 
 Outer diameter of base: 
 Inner diameter of base: 
 Weight: 
 Thickness of walls at the base: 
 Total number of bells: 7, tuned to musical scale, clockwise:
 1st bell: L'Assunta, cast in 1654 by Giovanni Pietro Orlandi, weight 
 2nd bell: Il Crocifisso, cast in 1572 by Vincenzo Possenti, weight 
 3rd bell: San Ranieri, cast in 1719–1721 by Giovanni Andrea Moreni, weight 
 4th bell: La Terza (1st small one), cast in 1473, weight 
 5th bell: La Pasquereccia or La Giustizia, cast in 1262 by Lotteringo, weight 
 6th bell: Il Vespruccio (2nd small one), cast in the 14th century and again in 1501 by Nicola di Jacopo, weight 
 7th bell: Dal Pozzo, cast in 1606 and again in 2004, weight 
 Number of steps to the top: 296

About the 5th bell: The name Pasquareccia comes from Easter, because it used to ring on Easter day. However, this bell is older than the bell-chamber itself, and comes from the tower Vergata in Palazzo Pretorio in Pisa, where it was called La Giustizia (The Justice). The bell was tolled to announce executions of criminals and traitors, including Count Ugolino in 1289. A new bell was installed in the bell tower at the end of the 18th century to replace the broken Pasquareccia.

The circular shape and great height of the campanile were unusual for their time, and the crowning belfry is stylistically distinct from the rest of the construction. This belfry incorporates a  correction for the inclined axis below. The siting of the campanile within the Piazza del Duomo diverges from the axial alignment of the cathedral and baptistery of the Piazza del Duomo.

Guinness World Records 
Two German churches have challenged the tower's status as the world's most lopsided building: the 15th-century square Leaning Tower of Suurhusen and the 14th-century bell tower in the town of Bad Frankenhausen. Guinness World Records measured the Pisa and Suurhusen towers, finding the former's tilt to be 3.97 degrees. In June 2010, Guinness World Records certified the Capital Gate building in Abu Dhabi, UAE as the "World's Furthest Leaning Man-made Tower"; it has an 18-degree slope, almost five times more than the Tower of Pisa, but was deliberately engineered to slant. The Leaning Tower of Wanaka in New Zealand, also deliberately built, leans at 53 degrees to the ground.

Gallery

See also 
 Leaning Temple of Huma
 List of leaning towers
 Leaning Tower of Niles, a replica of the Tower of Pisa
 Leaning Tower of Zaragoza, was a famous European leaning tower
 Great Mosque of al-Nuri (Mosul), an ancient leaning tower that stood until 2017; reconstruction efforts are currently underway
 List of tallest structures built before the 20th century
 Round tower (disambiguation), for other types of round towers
 The Greyfriars Tower, the remains of a Franciscan monastery in King's Lynn, nicknamed "The Leaning Tower of Lynn"
 Torre delle Milizie, a tilting medieval tower in Rome
 Tour de Pise, a rock dome in Antarctica, was named after this tower

References

External links 

 official site 
 Piazza dei Miracoli digital media archive (Creative Commonslicensed photos, laser scans, panoramas), data from a University of Ferrara/CyArk research partnership, includes 3D scan data from the Leaning Tower of Pisa.
 

1372 establishments in Europe
Bell towers in Italy
Buildings and structures completed in 1372
Inclined towers
Round towers
Romanesque architecture in Pisa
Tourist attractions in Pisa
Towers completed in the 14th century
Towers in Pisa
World Heritage Sites in Italy
Christian bell towers